Ya Bashar (English: Hey, Humans) is the thirteenth studio album by Lebanese recording artist Diana Haddad. The album was released by Rotana Records on December 17, 2014. Ya Bashar marks Haddad's first album in three years since Bent Osol was released in 2011. Ya Bashar is also Haddad's first collaboration with Arab World's largest music label Rotana Records, owned by Prince Al-Waleed bin Talal.

Track listing

Personnel
Personnel credits adapted from the album's booklet.

 Diana Haddad – vocals
 Hossam Kamel - sound engineer
 Jassim Mohammed - sound engineer
 Fares Jammal - photography
 Diana Haddad - artwork concept
 Alaa Dashti - make-up
 Mike Toro - hair dresser
 Saleemi - stylist

 Wissam Khattaf - backing vocals
 Hassan Faleh - backing vocals
 Mahmood Seror - backing vocals
 Sadeq Jafaar - backing vocals
 Jassim Mohammed - mastering
 Tony Haddad - mastering ("Eltowafah")
 Helmi Basheer - supervision
 Orange Advertising - graphic design

Release history

References

External links 

Diana Haddad albums
2014 albums